Kızılelma can refer to the following:

Aircraft
 Bayraktar Kızılelma, unmanned fighter jet under development by Turkish defense company Baykar

Places in Turkey
 Kızılelma, Bartın
 Kızılelma, Çan
 Kızılelma Cave